"I'm Not at All in Love" is a popular song written by Richard Adler and Jerry Ross, published in 1954. It was first presented in  the musical The Pajama Game by Janis Paige.

In the 1957 film version, it was sung by Doris Day and it appears in the soundtrack album.

References

 Who Wrote that Song Dick Jacobs & Harriet Jacobs, published by Writer's Digest Books, 1993
 Encyclopedia of the Musical Theatre Stanley Green, published by Dodd, Mead, 1976

Songs written by Richard Adler
Songs written by Jerry Ross (composer)
1954 songs
Songs from musicals